

Senatorial by-election
Stuart Syvret lost his seat in the house after being absent from Jersey, this meant that a by-election for Senator was held on Wednesday 16 June 2010. There was a 26.51% turnout for the election.

Results
Candidate (1 Elected) 
Francis Le Gresley 5,798 
Stuart Syvret 3,437
Patrick Ryan 3,212
Gerard Baudains 1,329
Geoff Southern 1,085
Nicholas Le Cornu 382
Gino Risoli 76
Philip Maguire 72
Peter Remon-Whorral 27

References

By 2010
2010 in Jersey